Deh Rais (also Romanized as Deh Ra’īs) is a village in Hoseynabad Rural District, in the Central District of Anar County, Kerman Province, Iran. At the 2006 census, its population was 1,107, in 257 families.

References 

Populated places in Anar County